Camsur Watersports Complex or Camarines Sur Watersports Complex is a watersports park designed for wakeboarding, wakeskating and waterskiing. Owned by the second degree grandson of former Hon. Luis Villafuerte, Juan Miguel Villafuerte. It is located within the Provincial Capitol Complex, Cadlan, Pili, Camarines Sur. Former The province of Camarines Sur, situated in southeastern part of Luzon is found in the Philippines, Southeast Asia.

References

External links
http://www.camsurwatersportscomplex.com
CWC Wake at WN

Sports complexes in the Philippines
Buildings and structures in Camarines Sur
Sports in Camarines Sur
Tourist attractions in Camarines Sur